Robert "Rocky" Balboa (also known by his ring name The Italian Stallion) is a fictional character and the titular protagonist of the Rocky film series. The character was created by Sylvester Stallone, who has also portrayed him in eight of the nine films in the franchise. He is depicted as a working class or poor Italian-American from the slums of Philadelphia who started out as a club fighter and "enforcer" for a local Philly Mafia loan shark. He is portrayed as overcoming the obstacles that had occurred in his life and in his career as a professional boxer.

While the story of his first film is loosely inspired by Chuck Wepner, a boxer who fought Muhammad Ali and lost on a TKO in the 15th round, the inspiration for the name, iconography and fighting style came from boxing legend Rocco Francis "Rocky Marciano" Marchegiano, though his surname coincidentally also resembles that of Middleweight Boxing Champion Thomas Rocco "Rocky Graziano" Barbella.

The character is widely considered to be Stallone's most iconic role and is often considered the role that started his film career. He received critical acclaim for his performance in the first movie, earning Academy Award and Golden Globe Award nominations. When Stallone reprised his role once again in 2015 for Creed, his performance received universal acclaim and he received his first Golden Globe Award for Best Supporting Actor, along with his third Oscar nomination for Best Supporting Actor, the National Board of Review Award for Best Supporting Actor and several other accolades.

Character biography
Robert "Rocky" Balboa was born in Philadelphia, Pennsylvania, on July 6, 1945. He was the only child in a Roman Catholic Italian-American or Italian immigrant family. When Rocky is spoken to by his Italian priest, Father Carmine, it is apparent that Rocky understands Italian very well or fluently, including in a scene in which he translates Italian into English for Tommy Gunn. However, it is undetermined how well he actually speaks the language, as his responses are always in English.
 
During the scene in which Rocky takes Adrianna "Adrian" Pennino skating on Thanksgiving, he tells her, "Yeah – My old man, who was never the sharpest, told me I weren't born with much brain, so I better use my body." This encouraged him to take up boxing. He trained very hard so he could grow up to be like his idol Rocky Marciano. Unable to live on the low pay of club fights, and being unable to find work anywhere else, Rocky got a job as a collector for Tony Gazzo, the local loan shark, just to make ends meet. By the end of 1975, Rocky had fought in 64 fights, winning 44 (38 KO'S) and losing 20. Rocky was proud that he never had his nose broken in any of his amateur fighting career. His nickname is "The Italian Stallion", spawning from his Italian-American heritage.

Rocky (1976)

The first film begins on November 25, 1975, in the slums of the Kensington section of Philadelphia. Rocky Balboa is fighting Spider Rico in a local boxing ring called the Cambria Fight Club (nicknamed "The Bucket of Blood") inside a chapel. In the second round, Rico hits Balboa with a headbutt, leaving a gash on his forehead. Rocky then delivers a vicious barrage of punches, knocking Rico out. The next day, Rocky stops by the J&M Tropical Fish pet shop, where he meets Adrian Pennino. Adrian is very shy and scared of Rocky's tough appearance, even though Rocky is very kind to her and shows her respect. Afterward, Rocky goes to collect a loan for his loan shark boss, Tony Gazzo. Even though the client, Bob, does not have all the money, Rocky does not break his thumbs, despite Gazzo ordering him to do so. Later, Rocky stops by the local boxing gym and finds out that his locker has been replaced by another local contender. Unknown to him, the gym's owner and grizzled former boxer, Mickey Goldmill, does not dislike him, but considers Rocky's potential to be better than his effort. When Rocky leaves for home that night, he sees a young girl named Marie hanging around a bad crowd and walks her home. On the way, Rocky lectures her about staying away from the wrong people. However, once they get to her house, she tells Rocky "Screw you, creep'o". Rocky walks home, frustrated how nothing is going right in his life.

Rocky gets his dream come true when the undisputed World Heavyweight Champion, Apollo Creed, decides that he wants to give an unknown fighter a chance to fight for the title after his intended challenger, Mac Lee Green, broke his hand while training. Creed was told that no other contender was available for a fight on New Years Day. Going against his trainer's warnings of Balboa being a southpaw (left-handed boxer), Creed chooses Rocky because he likes Balboa's nickname, 'The Italian Stallion'.

After getting picked by Creed, Rocky reunites with his estranged trainer, who convinces Rocky that he can help prepare him for the match. Mickey reveals that his career never got anywhere because he did not have a manager and he does not want the same thing to happen to Rocky. At the same time, Rocky begins dating Adrian. Rocky helps Adrian to become more self-confident and stand up for herself. Rocky confides in Adrian before the fight that, although he figures that he may not win, he wants to at least "go the distance."

On January 1, 1976, at the Philadelphia Spectrum, Rocky has his match with Creed, who did not take the fight seriously during training. In the first round, Rocky knocks Creed down, the first time he had ever been knocked down in his career and Creed responds by breaking Rocky's nose, the first time in his career. Creed soon realizes that, although Rocky does not have his level of skills, he has crippling, sledgehammer-like power and is determined to keep fighting. The match becomes a long and grueling battle for both competitors. Up into the 14th round, Rocky is nearly knocked out but manages to get back up and delivers some hard body shots, breaking Creed's ribs just before the bell. The 15th round comes to naught and Rocky manages to pummel Creed until the bell rings once more. It is the first time an opponent had lasted the full 15 rounds against him and as a result, it ends up with a split decision, Creed wins the fight and holds on to his title. Both combatants, battered beyond belief, agree that there would be no rematch. Rocky clearly doesn't mind about the outcome, as he only wanted to go the distance with Creed. After the match, Adrian climbs into the ring and embraces Rocky saying, "I love you!"

Rocky II (1979)

After the match, Creed changes his mind and demands a rematch under the stress of being humiliated by the press for failing to beat Rocky convincingly, as well as his own knowledge that he didn't give his best in the match. Creed demands a rematch with Rocky, stating that he would fight him 'anywhere, anyplace, anytime' to prove to the world that Rocky's feat was merely a fluke. Rocky initially declines and retires from boxing, having surgery for retinal detachment, a condition that could lead to permanent blindness. He marries Adrian, who convinces him to live outside boxing. However, Rocky, a grade-school drop-out, soon realizes that he has no white-collar skills beyond the eighth grade and is, in fact, barely literate.  [He does, however, improve his reading skills by reading books aloud to Adrian during her coma.] The money he made in his match with Creed is easily and quickly frittered away, so Adrian re-claims her part-time job at the J&M Tropical Fish pet shop. At first, Rocky seems to be unaffected by Creed's smear campaign, but his inexperience with money causes him to run into financial troubles. Rocky struggles to find employment with decent pay, when he is fired from a commercial studio, turned down for an office job and even laid off at the Shamrock meat packing facility. Despite Adrian's objections, and after Creed insults Rocky on national television and the newspaper, he agrees to the rematch. Without Adrian's support, however, Rocky becomes greatly discouraged and cannot concentrate on his training whatsoever, leaving Mick frustrated and worried. The now-pregnant Adrian goes into preterm labor on the job due to stress and slips into a coma after giving birth to her first child, Robert Jr. When Adrian is out of the coma, she promises her full support to Rocky. Together, Mickey and Rocky train hard, focusing on Rocky's speed and improving his right-handed punching (Rocky being a southpaw). At the same time, Creed is also focused on his training, taking this match much more seriously than the previous time. The rematch is set for Thanksgiving. The match goes on for the full 15 rounds again, with both Rocky and Creed falling to the canvas after Rocky lands a succession of left hands. As referee Lou Fillipo exercises his 10-count to the limit, both Creed and Rocky struggle to get back up and Creed falls back down in exhaustion. Rocky is able to get back up from sheer determination, beating the 10-count and winning the rematch by knockout, thus becoming heavyweight champion of the world.

Rocky III (1982)

Over the next three years, Rocky has successfully defended his title in ten consecutive matches against various contenders, amassing a wealthy fortune and worldwide fame in the process. In addition, Rocky also has an exhibition match against the World Heavyweight Wrestling Champion, "Thunderlips" (Hulk Hogan), with the match ending in a draw. However, in 1981, Rocky is challenged by a young power-hungry fighter named James "Clubber" Lang (Mr. T), who has risen to the top of the rankings. Rocky begins having some issues with his trainer, Mickey Goldmill, due to his revelation of having faced "hand-picked" challengers that were "good fighters, but not 'killers'" which Lang seemingly is. Mickey insists that he would step down as Rocky's manager if he chooses to fight Lang, but Rocky convinces him to train him for one last match. However, just like Creed in the first film, Rocky does not put his heart into the training properly, and this reinforces Mickey's belief that Rocky has become too comfortable (or "civilized") as champion. Before the match, pandemonium erupts backstage, with Lang shoving Mickey out of the way during a trash-talk exchange of words with Rocky, causing Mickey to suffer from cardiac arrest. Distraught over Lang's cold indifference, Rocky requests to call the match off, but Mickey urges him on. A distracted Rocky attempts to knock Lang out early with a barrage of huge blows, but his lack of proper conditioning quickly wears him out. Lang, who has trained with ruthless vigor, recovers and easily knocks out Rocky in the second round, causing Rocky to lose his title. After the match, Rocky visits Mickey, who then dies of a heart attack, devastating Rocky. After the funeral, a depressed Rocky wanders the streets of Philadelphia until seeing the statue at the steps. In a fit of rage, Rocky throws his motorcycle helmet at the statue and takes off until he visits Mickey's now-abandoned gym. In the gym, Rocky meets Apollo Creed, who explains to Rocky, that when they fought, he won because he was competitive. He has the 'fire' Creed no longer has and the former champion convinces Rocky that he needs to get his fire ("the eye of the tiger") back. Along with his old trainer, Tony "Duke" Evers, Creed offers to train Rocky for a rematch against Lang, taking Rocky to Los Angeles. While training on the beach, Adrian and Rocky furiously debate, while Creed trains Rocky to help get him "back to basics." After a while, Rocky manages to put his doubts behind him and retain his spirit. Fighting with a style very reminiscent of Creed's own boxing technique mixed with his own style, Rocky wins the rematch against Lang by K.O., dodging and absorbing Lang's best blows and still standing, regaining his world heavyweight title. After the match, Rocky and Creed meet again in Mickey's Gym, with Creed taking his "payment" for his training services: one last rematch, just the two of them, no spectators.

Rocky IV (1985)

Apollo Creed agrees to have an exhibition match against Soviet World Amateur Champion and Olympic gold medalist-turned-professional fighter Ivan Drago (Dolph Lundgren) in Las Vegas, with Rocky Balboa and Tony "Duke" Evers in his corner. Creed, past his prime but in good shape, again not taking his opponent seriously, takes a serious beating by Drago in the first round, despite Rocky's orders to stop the fight. In the second round, Creed continues to be brutally beaten by Drago, falling limp in the ring and dying. Feeling responsible for Creed's death and riddled with guilt by Drago's cold indifference, Rocky decides to take on Drago himself, but to do so, he has to surrender his championship. 
Rocky travels to the cold mountains of Russia and undergoes rigorous training, even after being berated by Adrian, who said that Rocky couldn't win against Drago. His match against Drago takes place on Christmas Day 1985 in Moscow. With Evers assuming the role as his new trainer, Rocky trains hard using old-school methods within the mountainous terrain of Krasnoyarsk, Siberia, while Drago trains with state-of-the-art equipment and steroid enhancement.

During the match, Drago gains the upper hand in the early moments, but in the second round, Rocky strikes back against Drago with a haymaker to the eye, cutting him. The match goes on in a bloody back-and-forth battle, with the Soviet crowd, who originally roots for Drago, beginning to cheer for Rocky, while Drago's handler becomes increasingly upset over his inability to finish Rocky. In the end, Rocky's superior stamina and determination to win perseveres and defeats the heavily favored Russian in the fifteenth round. After the match, Rocky gives a passionate 'thank you' speech to the crowd while receiving a standing ovation both from the crowd and the politicians in attendance.

Rocky V (1990)

The year is 1986, Shortly after the bout with Ivan Drago, Rocky realizes while he is showering that he may have sustained some type of injury during the fight. His hands tremble relentlessly, and he tells Adrian that he is tired and wants to go home, but accidentally addresses her as Mickey. Upon returning to the United States (in a Soviet airplane), his press conference is interrupted by promoter George Washington Duke and Union Cane (Michael Williams). They challenge him to a title fight called "Lettin' it Go in Tokyo." Rocky hints about retirement and leaves without accepting the challenge. Once returning home, Rocky goes to say goodnight to his son, Robert Jr., but when Rocky goes downstairs, he overhears Adrian and Paulie arguing, which turns out to be a dramatic life-changing situation. Paulie unknowingly had Rocky sign a power of attorney over to Rocky's investment accountant, who had embezzled and squandered all of his money on real estate deals gone sour. In addition, the accountant had failed to pay Rocky's taxes over the past six years and his mansion had been mortgaged by $400,000. Unwilling to go bankrupt, Rocky decides to participate in a few more fights, including the one against Union Cane, but Adrian demands that Rocky should see a doctor first. Rocky's doctor, Presley Jensen, reveals that Rocky is suffering from a condition called Cavum septi pellucidi, which is brain damage caused by extremely heavy blows to the head. The effects are seemingly permanent and irreversible. With such a condition, it would make it impossible for Rocky to continue boxing in any state. At Adrian's urging, as well as with the doctor's support, Rocky gravely acknowledges that it is time to retire and he reluctantly does so.

His only remaining asset is the now-closed Mickey's Gym, which had been willed by Mickey to Robert, making it virtually untouchable by the IRS. After selling their mansion and auctioning some of their belongings, Rocky and the family now return to the old neighborhood, moving back into Adrian and Paulie's old house in South Philadelphia. Rocky reopens Mickey's Gym as a means of income, while Adrian returns to work at the J&M Tropical Fish pet shop, where she was employed during the time she first met Rocky. Rocky asks Adrian, "Did we ever leave this place?". One day, Rocky meets a young ruffian boxer from Oklahoma named Tommy Gunn (Tommy Morrison) and begins training him. Tommy slowly becomes an excellent fighter, but suffers from constantly being put in Rocky's shadow; he is nicknamed "Rocky's Robot" by the media. As Rocky is training Tommy, he becomes so distracted that he ends up neglecting Robert. On Christmas Eve, Tommy visits the Balboa residence and tells Rocky he wants to team up with Duke, but Rocky explains that dealing with Duke would be a dirty business. Tommy regrets being Rocky's protégé, drives off in a huff, and leaves him for good. Adrian attempts to comfort Rocky, but Rocky's frustration boils over. After they reconcile, Rocky meets Robert and they finally pick up the pieces.

Rocky is still anxious as he watches the match with Tommy facing off against Union Cane on television with Paulie. As the match starts out small, Rocky begins to emote through the first couple of seconds of the fight as Cane becomes effective in hurting Tommy. As Tommy begins to make his adjustments as Rocky taught him, Rocky then mirrors his punches on a punching bag, which leaves his family concerned. Tommy wins the world heavyweight title from Union Cane by knockout. Visibly proud of Tommy, Rocky is surprised that Tommy credited his success to Duke instead of Rocky. However, Tommy is booed and ridiculed in the press conference, since he had never gone up against a "real contender" he is not regarded as a real champion or heir to the belt. This motivates Tommy, with prodding from Duke, to publicly challenge Rocky to a fight.

While Rocky is at a local bar, Tommy steps in and insults Rocky. Paulie insults Tommy back and is sucker-punched by Tommy. Rocky confronts Tommy and challenges him by saying "you knocked him down, why don't you try knocking me down?". When Duke intervenes and says that Tommy "only fights in the ring", Rocky explains to him that his "ring's outside". As both fighters head to the alley, Duke tries to persuade Tommy to not fight a street fighter, but Tommy squares upon him, saying that he does not own him and wants his respect.

Rocky then quickly starts to beat Tommy without giving him a chance, knocking him down. Rocky tells Tommy that, even though he admires him, he actually ruined their relationship. With Rocky's back turned, Tommy sucker punches him and starts attacking some of the bystanders on the side. Tommy gains the upper hand and tackles Rocky through a steel door into the street. The two engage in a street fight, which quickly garners the attention of the media, while also catching Robert and Adrian's attention as well. As the neighborhood gathers round to witness the fight, Tommy's punches begin to slow Rocky in his tracks due to his condition and he is knocked down, disoriented with Paulie at his side. Tommy is then restrained from finishing Rocky off.

Glimpses of Ivan Drago, his loss to Clubber Lang during his first fight with him and Mickey's burial start to cloud his mind until he hears Mickey's voice, telling him that he is the champion and to get up. As Tommy walks away, convinced that he finally got what he wanted, Rocky rises up and calls him out for one more round and Tommy happily obliges. An adamant Duke reminds Tommy that if he loses this, he will terminate their association. In a shocking turn of events, Rocky uses his brawling abilities to punish and humiliate Tommy. With his back against a gate, Rocky dodges several hooks from Tommy and manages to push him towards the gate, shoving him with brute force and a powerful left hook knocking Tommy down again. Duke threatens to sue Rocky if he touches him and becomes infuriated at Tommy. Tommy gets up and tackles Rocky to the ground and later lifts him up. Just as Robert joins the crowd, Rocky breaks free from Tommy's grip and performs a reversal that sends Tommy spiraling into a pile of trash cans. Both men now exchange punches with Rocky being the aggressor, making Tommy miss his shots. Rocky is then caught by a series of punches by Tommy, just as Adrian joins the crowd, but manages to parry Tommy and begins to walk him down with his devastating shots. Seeing the opportunity, Rocky goes to Tommy's body, then lands perfect headshots and finishes with a right uppercut sending Tommy to the grill of a bus, defeating his former protégé. As Adrian and Robert tend to him, Rocky tells Adrian that she was right. The neighborhood's cheer is then silenced by Duke as he tries to sarcastically commend Rocky. He confronts Duke, who still continues to threaten him with a lawsuit. Since Rocky and his family have been declared bankrupt, Rocky clenches his fist and uppercuts Duke to the gut which lifts him off the ground, sending him to the hood of his own limousine, telling him "Sue me for what?". Rocky, Adrian, Robert, and Paulie walk away in good spirits as the neighborhood continues to cheer him on.

Some time later, Rocky and his son run up the Philadelphia Museum of Art, where Rocky gives him a valuable possession of Mickey Goldmill's that had been passed on to him by Rocky Marciano. The two make up for the tensions of the past few years and head into the museum together.

Rocky Balboa (2006)

In 2006, 20 years after the events of Rocky V, Rocky, now in his early sixties, has been going through changing times in his life. He runs a small but rather successful restaurant called 'Adrian's', named after his wife who died of ovarian cancer four years prior. Rocky is no longer depressed and broke, and is doing far better than he was in years prior. Rocky visits Adrian's graveside regularly and each year, on the anniversary of her death, takes a tour of the old places, where their relationship began and blossomed: the now-closed J&M Tropical Fish pet shop where Adrian worked, the former site of the ice skating rink where they had their first date and Rocky's old apartment, where they fell in love. Rocky's son, Robert Jr., is now working as a struggling mid-level corporate employee and has been farther apart from his family over the years, but reluctantly joins Rocky to commemorate the anniversaries of his mother's death.

An episode of ESPN's program, Then and Now, airs featuring a computer-simulated fight between Rocky (in his prime) and the current champion, Mason "The Line" Dixon (Antonio Tarver). The simulation result sees Rocky winning by knockout in the thirteenth round, which stirs up a discussion about the result if such a fight ever occurred. Inspired by the simulation and feeling he still has some issues to deal with ("stuff in the basement"), Rocky decides to return to the ring and applies to renew his boxing license. Though Rocky passes the required physical with flying colors, the licensing committee denies his application, citing his advanced age and their moral duty to protect him from himself. Rocky responds to this with an impassioned speech of his own and the committee change their minds to renew his license.

The brain damage Rocky is diagnosed within Rocky V is not addressed in this film, but in interviews, Stallone has said that the storyline explanation would have been that Rocky's brain damage was within the normal range for boxers. When tested for brain damage in Rocky V, Rocky was suffering the effects of a severe concussion as a result of the Drago fight, but he never sought a second or more informed opinion because he intended to retire anyway.

Rocky's intentions were originally just to compete in small, local fights, but with the publicity of Rocky's return right on the heels of the embarrassing computer simulation, Mason Dixon's promoters convince Rocky to challenge the champ in an exhibition match at the MGM Grand in Las Vegas. Originally against fighting an aged Rocky, Dixon recognizes the opportunity to fight a legend and hopes to end all prognosticating about who would win as well as contentions that he has never had a truly great opponent or memorable match. In the press, commentators dismiss Rocky's chances and the merits of the fight, assuming that it will be one-sided due to Rocky's age, despite their original excitement with Rocky's return to the ring, and their doubts regarding Dixon's ability. Before the fight, the boxing record that was presented for each boxer was, for Rocky: 57 wins (54 by KO), 23 losses, and 1 draw; for Dixon: 33 wins (30 by KO).

As news of the bout spreads, Robert begins to feel more pressure from being Rocky's son and makes an effort to discourage Rocky from fighting, blaming his own personal failings on his father's celebrity shadow, but Rocky rebukes him with some profound advice: to succeed in life, "it ain't about how hard you hit; it's about how hard you can get hit, and keep moving forward" and that blaming others won't help him. The day after this debate, father and son meet over Adrian's grave and reconcile, which is when Robert announces that he has resigned from his job to be at ringside. Rocky also reunites with his old trainer, Duke, and both men quickly realize that age and arthritis have sapped Rocky of any speed he once possessed. They decide to focus on one major remaining weapon: power.

When the match begins, it appears to be as lopsided as everyone predicted, with Dixon's speed allowing him to dominate Rocky at will, knocking him down twice early on. However, the champion soon realizes that Rocky will not back down and that the elderly Rocky "has bricks in his gloves". The tide turns when Dixon injures his hand while punching Rocky. This evens the playing field and allows Rocky to mount an offense, knocking Dixon down for the first time in the latter's career. During the subsequent rounds, Dixon's injury numbs up, which enables him to throw much harder punches and pose a threat to Rocky. In the final round, it starts out slow for both combatants. After a brief exchange of punches, Dixon catches Rocky with a strong blow, knocking down Rocky for the third time. As Rocky takes the knee, he looks to Robert in the corner and has flashbacks of his time with Adrian, remembering what she said to him about never giving up. As he slowly gets up, the crowd, along with Marie, starts to chant his name and he rises to Dixon's surprise. As the final thirty seconds unfold, Dixon manages to catch Rocky with quick punches; however, an emotional Rocky retaliates with devastating punches of his own. The two exchange punches, but Rocky gets the final blow before the bell rings. In the end, the two fighters go the distance and show their appreciation for each other. Before the winner is announced, Rocky and his entourage make their way out of the ring in celebration. As Dixon is announced the winner by split decision ), Rocky thanks each and every one of his group and, with Robert and Paulie by his side, they turn Rocky around and raise his arms as the audience gives him a heartfelt standing ovation. Dixon is finally recognized as being a warrior for fighting through every round and Rocky proves to the world that he is no joke, mirroring the ending of the first film.

After the fight, Rocky visits Adrian's grave and puts flowers on top, telling her, "Yo, Adrian, we did it", which is a play on the second film's line, "Yo, Adrian, I did it!". Rocky is last seen walking away from the grave and waving goodbye one last time.

Creed (2015)

Since Rocky's very last fight, his brother-in-law Paulie has died. In addition, his statue has been re-installed at the Philadelphia Museum of Art at the very bottom of the steps. Three years later, Rocky is visited at Adrian's by Donnie Creed (Michael B. Jordan) – Apollo's illegitimate son, who grew up serving time at a juvenile detention center in Los Angeles. After Donnie grew up, he worked as a securities firm at the Smith Boardley Financial Group, but eventually resigned to be a boxer and moved to Philadelphia. Donnie meets Rocky at Adrian's restaurant and requests him to train him, but Rocky is reluctant to come back to the sport of boxing after his brain damage and a one-off comeback. Days after his initial offer, Rocky recommends him to his friend, Pete Sporino (Ritchie Coster), who currently runs Mighty Mick's Gym. After deep thought, Rocky finally agrees to take Donnie as his new protégé.

Wanting to train in the old-school style, Donnie moves in with Rocky, staying in Paulie's former room. Donnie notices an old picture of Rocky and his son, Robert (an actual picture of Sylvester Stallone and a young Sage Stallone), Rocky reveals that Robert had moved to Vancouver with his girlfriend, because of the difficulties he faced trying to be independent in Philadelphia, but does check on his father every now and then. Pete, who initially wanted Rocky to be a part of his son, Leo's (Gabriel Rosado) team, challenges Donnie to fight his son, in which Rocky shows reluctance again, but then both agree. Instead of training at Mighty Mick's Gym, Rocky takes Donnie to train at the Front Street Gym, where he surprises Donnie with a corner team and apparel. Before the fight, Pete pulls Rocky aside to address the rumors of Donnie being Apollo's son, which Rocky confirms, and tells him that he should not speak of it to anyone else. After Donnie's win, the media heavily publicized the story of Apollo's infidelity, which catches the eye of Tommy Holiday (Graham McTavish), who is looking for the final person to fight his trainee, light-heavyweight champion "Pretty" Ricky Conlan (Tony Bellew). While training, Rocky suddenly stalls, vomits, and collapses in the gym. After doing a string of test ordered by the doctors at the emergency room, Rocky is diagnosed with an early case of non-Hodgkin lymphoma, making him confront his own mortality. At first, Rocky is hesitant to the option of chemotherapy, as he remembers the pain Adrian experienced as she underwent treatment for ovarian cancer.

After a bitter argument with the former heavyweight champion, Donnie, greatly impacted by his coach's diagnosis, makes a pact with Rocky that they would fight their battles together, as Donnie prepares for his bout with Conlan and as Rocky undergoes treatment. As Donnie moves on in training, the effects of treatment begin to weaken Rocky, and because of this, Donnie acts as a caregiver to Rocky while helping him get up and go to the restroom, and uses the medical facility to his advantage; shadowboxing in the corridors and running up the stairs, passing doctors and nurses. With the match taking place in Liverpool, a calm Rocky teaches Donnie the hysterics that would ensue during the pre-fight press conference when Conlan tries to play mind games, and later helps in Donnie's girlfriend Bianca (Tessa Thompson) surprising Donnie in his hotel room. During the match, Rocky stands in Donnie's corner along with Bianca. Before the final round, Rocky grows concerned about the injuries that Donnie has sustained and tells him he's stopping the fight. However, Donnie wants to prove that he is "not a mistake", which emotionally impacts Rocky. He then tells Donnie that he wishes he had the chance to thank Apollo after Mickey died, but it doesn't match his appreciation of Donnie's tenacity that motivated him in his battle against his illness and tells him that he admires him.  A newly motivated Adonis goes on to fights a competitive final round against Conlan, even knocking him down near the round's conclusion, but ultimately loses the match by split decision in a manner that mirrors Rocky's initial bout against Apollo.

The film concludes with Donnie taking a frail, but rather improving, Rocky back to the steps of the Philadelphia Museum of Art, which Rocky says is his "most favorite place." Both look toward the Philadelphia skyline, remaining positive about their futures.

Creed II (2018)

Three years since his diagnosis, Rocky has recovered from his cancer and coached Donnie to the WBC World Heavyweight championship. Rocky gives Donnie advice in proposing to Bianca and uses his proposal with Adrian as an example. Rocky struggles with contacting Robert, with whom he has, once again, an estranged relationship.

Later on, Rocky drops by Adrian's and finds Ivan Drago waiting for him there. Drago tells him how his loss to Rocky 33 years earlier shattered his reputation, evicted him from Russia into Ukraine, and led to his divorce from his wife, Ludmilla. Drago threatens him by saying his son, Viktor (Florian Munteanu), has trained all his life and will "break" Donnie, issuing a fight challenge to Donnie earlier that morning. Rocky, clearly shaken, politely tells Drago to leave.

Wanting to avenge his father and forge his own legacy, Donnie decides to take up Viktor's challenge and goes to Rocky's place for his approval. Rocky refuses to support Donnie, noting that Viktor was raised in hate and has nothing to lose, and that makes him dangerous. Despite Donnie's pleas, Rocky declines to train him out of fear and guilt from Apollo's fateful match years prior.

Rocky decides to watch Donnie and Viktor's match, where he watches Viktor pummel Donnie repeatedly. Viktor illegally hits Donnie while he is down, knocking him unconscious; Rocky turns off his television in horror at what he has witnessed. Rocky travels to Los Angeles to visit a hospitalized Donnie, who lashes out at him for abandoning him.

With Donnie becoming detached from his family, Donnie's stepmother and Apollo's widow Mary Anne (Phylicia Rashad) contacts Rocky in helping him out of his slump. Donnie and Rocky make amends, and Rocky accompanies Donnie as Bianca gives birth to their daughter, Amara. When Amara is revealed to be deaf, Rocky advises him that they should not pity her condition, and instead treat her fully with their love.

Rocky and Tony "Little Duke" Evers (Wood Harris) take Donnie to a decrepit location in the California desert to retrain, describing it as a place where fighters are "reborn". Donnie undergoes a rigorous and brutal training regimen with Rocky, focusing on fighting from the inside and training his body to repeatedly absorb the heavy impact he knows he will receive from Viktor in the ring. Rocky accompanies Donnie as they hold their rematch with Viktor in Moscow; Donnie withstands Viktor's blows and wins the match after Drago throws in the towel. Rocky doesn't join Donnie's celebration, saying that it's "his time," and watches in contentment from outside the ring.

Rocky later travels to Vancouver where he reunites with Robert and meets his grandson Logan for the first time. Rocky is now 73 years old.

Future
On July 23, 2019, in an interview with Variety, Stallone said that a Rocky direct sequel and prequel are in development. Producer Irwin Winkler said "We're very high on it" and those negotiations are underway for Stallone to write and star in the feature. Stallone said the plot of the movie would be about Rocky befriending a young fighter who is an undocumented immigrant. "Rocky meets a young, angry person who got stuck in this country when he comes to see his sister. He takes him into his life, and unbelievable adventures begin, and they wind up south of the border. It's very, very timely." Stallone said. Stallone also said there are "ongoing discussions" about a Rocky prequel television series, which he hopes will land on a streaming service and the series will likely follow a young Rocky Balboa as professional boxing hopeful. Stallone said Winkler is hesitant on making the series saying that "There was some conflict there, yes. He felt in his mind that Rocky was primarily a feature film, and he did not see it as being translated for cable, so there was a big bone of contention."

Personal life
Balboa resides in Philadelphia, Pennsylvania, and married Adriana "Adrian" Pennino in 1976. They were married for 26 years. The two have a son, Robert Balboa Jr., who unlike his father goes by Robert.

After Adrian's death in 2002, Rocky and his brother-in-law Paulie lived together for a short time, then Paulie moved in with an unnamed girlfriend. Now living completely alone again, Rocky cannot come to terms with present-day living and constantly thinks about the past. With the help of Paulie and reunited long-time acquaintance Marie, Rocky begins to move on with his life and in the process restores his relationship with his only child, Robert. Rocky's relationship with Marie is established as platonic in the film, but a hint of romantic interest is revealed with a kiss on the lips the night before the last fight of his life.

Shortly after, Paulie passes away and Rocky's relationship with his son becomes strained due to Robert distancing himself from any contact with him, leaving him alone again. A few years later, he meets Adonis Creed, the illegitimate son of his old friend, Apollo Creed, who asks him to come train him. After initially declining to, Rocky agreed and the two would have a father-son relationship. Eventually, Rocky learns he's been diagnosed with cancer and turns down treatment, seeing it as a chance to be reunited with his loved ones, although Adonis convinces him to keep fighting and decides to take treatment, saving him. When Adonis's wife, Bianca, gave birth to a daughter, Rocky was named her godfather. 

For years, Rocky attempted to reestablish contact with his estranged son, Robert, but never went through with it. However, after helping Adonis conquer Viktor Drago, Rocky decides to visit his son in Vancouver where they finally begin to reconcile and meets his grandson, Logan, who bears a striking resemblance to Adrian.

Character origin
The name, iconography, and fighting style of Rocky Balboa was inspired by the legendary heavyweight champion Rocky Marciano from Brockton, Massachusetts and from the 5 times world champion Roberto 'Manos de Piedra (Hands of Stone)' Durán, from Panama, where the Balboa is the official currency. Balboa was also inspired by other fighting legends: Joe Frazier, for his Philadelphia origin, training methods and victory against Muhammad Ali (the inspiration for Apollo Creed), and Jake LaMotta, for his Italian-inner city roots, ability to absorb many blows and his rivalry with Sugar Ray Robinson, which heavily resembled Rocky and Apollo's. However, it was Chuck Wepner who inspired the movie and Balboa's underdog personality.

Boxing style

Rocky Balboa fights as a southpaw (left-handed). In the second film, against Apollo Creed, he comes out orthodox and Mickey intends for him to switch back to southpaw late in the last round, but Balboa refuses saying "no tricks, I ain't switching".  Mickey tells him that Apollo is ready for him (if he continues using his right) and so towards the end of the round, he does indeed lead with his left. The real reason for this is Sylvester Stallone tore his pectoral muscles in training, but the idea was probably taken from the great southpaw boxer "Marvelous" Marvin Hagler who would sometimes come out orthodox to confuse opponents.

Rocky was an all-or-nothing brawler coming into his first bout with Creed; however, under the training of Mickey, he began to develop his boxing skills which he eventually mastered. During his reign as world champion, he became a class hybrid fighter, possessing the qualities of an inside fighter, brawler, and swarmer. With the exception of his rematch against Clubber Lang (where he fights as an outside fighter), he often advances quickly upon his opponents, driving them into the ropes in order to attack the body. Balboa's best attribute is without question his near-superhuman ability to absorb a multitude of the hardest hits without falling — an attribute he often employs on purpose to wear down his opponents, sacrificing defensive strategy to land his own punches. Because of this rare talent, Balboa can afford to keep his hands in position to strike rather than up high to block. Because he takes more punches than he throws, it is easy to overlook his incredible punching power. Rocky also has an uncanny ability to sense weakness in his opponents, often capitalizing on every shift in momentum possible. He is acknowledged as having the most devastating body attack in the sport, with his body blows causing internal bleeding in Creed and breaking Drago's ribs. After going two rounds with Balboa, Ivan Drago told his trainer (in Russian), "He's not human, he's like a piece of iron." Mason Dixon once remarked about Balboa: "that guy's got bricks in his gloves." These qualities, in concert, helped land him a high percentage of KO victories over the course of his career.

Honors
Rocky Balboa was named the 7th greatest movie hero by the American Film Institute on their 100 Years... 100 Heroes and Villains list. Additionally, he was ranked  36 on Empire Magazine's compilation of The 100 Greatest Movie Characters. Premiere magazine ranked Rocky Balboa No. 64 on their list of The 100 Greatest Movie Characters of All Time.

The Rocky character is immortalised with a bronze statue erected near the Rocky Steps at the Philadelphia Museum of Art recalling the famous scene from the original Rocky movie. 

In 2007, a Rocky statue was erected in the Serbian village of Žitiste. 

In 2011, Sylvester Stallone was inducted into the International Boxing Hall of Fame for his work on the Rocky Balboa character, having "entertained and inspired boxing fans from around the world". Additionally, Stallone was awarded the Boxing Writers Association of America award for "Lifetime Cinematic Achievement in Boxing." Inspired by people criticizing an actor being inducted in the Hall of Fame for playing a ficticious athlete, in 2014 the Fictitious Athlete Hall of Fame was launched with Rocky Balboa as its Inaugural Induction.

A poll of former heavyweight champions and boxing writers ranked Balboa as the best boxer in the film series.

Merchandising
Hasbro intended to license Rocky and make him a member of the G.I. Joe toyline, as they had with wrestler Sgt. Slaughter and began negotiations with Stallone's representation. Marvel Comics' G.I. Joe: Order of Battle profile book came out during the negotiations and included Rocky as a current Joe member, specializing in hand-to-hand combat training and an example of what it means to persevere under seemingly impossible odds. Balboa also appeared on the cover of the issue. In the meantime, Stallone's agents made a deal with Coleco to produce Rambo figures in order to compete with the G.I. Joe line. Hasbro, who was working on a toy prototype at the time, decided to end negotiations at that point. Marvel ran a retraction in the third issue of the limited-run series indicating that the character was not, and never had been, a part of G.I. Joe. The trade paperback edition of the series, published in July 1987, omitted the page featuring Balboa altogether.

Between 2006 and 2009, Jakks Pacific released six series of figures, each focused on one of the movies in the film series. Additionally, two "Best Of" series were released, as well as several collector's box sets, boxing ring playsets, and limited edition exclusive figures.

Notes

References

Fictional characters from Philadelphia
Fictional characters from Pennsylvania
Fictional professional boxers
Fictional sports coaches
Fictional characters with cancer
Fictional male sportspeople
Fictional martial arts trainers
Martial artist characters in films
Rocky characters
Film characters introduced in 1976
Sylvester Stallone
Fictional Italian American people